Aleksey Igorevich Kuznetsov (born 20 August 1996) is a Russian football player who plays for FC Veles Moscow.

Club career
He made his debut in the Russian Football National League for FC Dynamo Bryansk on 1 August 2020 in a game against FC Orenburg.

On 24 June 2021, he signed a long-term contract with Russian Premier League club FC Ufa. On 9 February 2022, Kuznetsov was loaned to FC Veles Moscow.

International career
He was included in the Russian squad for the 2013 UEFA European Under-17 Championship (which Russia won) and 2013 FIFA U-17 World Cup, but remained on the bench in all games.

Career statistics

References

External links
 
 Profile by Russian Football National League
 

1996 births
Sportspeople from Bryansk
Living people
Russian footballers
Russia youth international footballers
Russia under-21 international footballers
Association football goalkeepers
FC Chertanovo Moscow players
FC Volga Nizhny Novgorod players
FC Zimbru Chișinău players
FC Dynamo Bryansk players
FC Ufa players
FC Veles Moscow players
Russian First League players
Russian Second League players
Russian expatriate footballers
Expatriate footballers in Moldova
Russian expatriate sportspeople in Moldova